Gyrineum bituberculare is a species of predatory sea snail, a marine gastropod mollusk in the family Cymatiidae.

Description
The length of the shell varies between 27 mm and 50 mm.

Distribution
This marine species occurs in the Indo-West Pacific.

References

External links
 

Cymatiidae
Gastropods described in 1816